Coleophora ulmivorella is a moth of the family Coleophoridae. It is found in Japan.

The wingspan is about 9 mm.

The larvae feed on Ulmus davidiana var. japonica, Ulmus davidiana, Ulmus laciniata and Kalopanax ricinifolius. They create a leaf-case which is slightly bent at the base. It is dark greyish-brown and 4.5-5.5 mm in length. The larvae mine into the leaf of their host plant until mid-June.

References

ulmivorella
Moths of Japan
Moths described in 1965